The Potomac Rugby Conference is a men's intercollegiate rugby conference of the National Small College Rugby Organization.

This conference now consist of the college men rugby teams from the District of Columbia and Maryland. It previously included other teams and was also a DII conference affiliated with USA Rugby.

Member schools

Current members

Former members

A new Division I-AA conference named Chesapeake Collegiate Rugby Conference was established to begin competition in Fall 2016, consisting of schools from the Potomac, Atlantic Coast and Cardinals Conferences. Georgetown, Mount St. Mary's, Salisbury, and Towson joined the new conference.

Gettysburg College transferred to the Potomac Conference in the Fall of 2016 from the Eastern Pennsylvania Rugby Union, but moved to the Mid Atlantic Rugby Conference in 2018.

Conference champions 

Loyola took 4th place at the national championship in 2018.

References

External links
Official website

National Small College Rugby Organization
College rugby conferences in the United States